Cappy Thompson (born January 22, 1952) is an American artist who works in the medium of glass. The basis of her reverse glass painting technique is Grisaille, which has been used on stained glass since the Middle Ages.  She lives and works in Seattle, Washington and has a residence in Olympia. She has been an artist in residence at Pilchuck Glass School and is a recipient of the school's Libensky award. Her best-known public works are Dreaming of Spirit Animals at Seattle-Tacoma International Airport and Gathering the Light in the lobby of the Museum of Glass in Tacoma.

Solo exhibitions
 Montgomery Museum of Fine Arts, Montgomery, Alabama. March 4-May 14, 2006

Honors and awards 
2012 John Hauberg Fellowship, Pilchuck Glass School, Stanwood, Washington 
2001 John Hauberg Fellowship, Pilchuck Glass School, Stanwood, Washington 
1998 Artist Images Series Bookmark, University of Washington Libraries, Seattle, Washington 
1997 Fellowship, Artist Trust, Seattle, Washington 
1995 Artist in Residence, Toyama City Institute of Glass Art, Toyama, Japan 
1990 Fellowship for the Visual Arts, National Endowment for the Arts 
1984 Artist in Residence, Pilchuck Glass School, Stanwood, Washington

References

External links
Cappy Thompson Painted Glass

20th-century American artists
21st-century American artists
Artists from Washington (state)
Artists from Seattle
People from Olympia, Washington
American glass artists
Living people
1952 births